The Overseas Territories Police Medal (OTPM), known as the Colonial Police Medal (CPM) until April 2012, is a medal awarded for gallantry or distinguished service to all ranks of police forces and organised fire brigades in British Overseas Territories, and formerly in Crown Colonies and British Dependent Territories. Police officers in these areas can also be awarded the higher ranking King's Police Medal. The CPM was first awarded in 1938.

The most common form of the CPM was the Colonial Police Medal for Meritorious Service. The equivalent for gallantry, the Colonial Police Medal for Gallantry, which could be awarded posthumously, had not been awarded since 1974 and was effectively replaced by the Queen's Gallantry Medal, which has been awarded posthumously since 1977. Queen Elizabeth II made the last presentations to two recipients in 1975 while she was in Hong Kong.

Ribbon clasps could be bestowed to the gallantry medal for further acts, marked with a silver rosette on the ribbon when worn alone.

From 1938 to 1979, 482 medals for gallantry were awarded, including 17 to fire brigade members, in addition to nine second award clasps. In the same period 3,305 medals for meritorious service were awarded, including 169 to fire brigade members.

When worn with other decorations, the medal for gallantry is worn immediately before the King’s Gallantry Medal, the medal for meritorious service immediately before jubilee and coronation awards.

Description
It is a circular silver medal, 36 mm in diameter, with the ribbon suspended from a ring. It has the following design:
 The obverse bears the profile of the reigning monarch with an appropriate inscription.
 There are different reverse designs for police and fire brigade recipients:Police: a vertical truncheon in front of a laurel wreath, surrounded by the words 'OVERSEAS TERRITORIES POLICE FORCES FOR GALLANTRY', or 'FOR MERITORIOUS SERVICE'. Until 2012 the wording referred to 'COLONIAL POLICE FORCES'.Fire brigade: a firefighter's helmet and axe superimposed on a laurel wreath. Inscribed around the edge are the words 'OVERSEAS TERRITORIES FIRE BRIGADES FOR GALLANTRY', or 'FOR MERITORIOUS SERVICE'. Until 2012 the wording referred to 'COLONIAL FIRE BRIGADES'.
 The medals are issued with the details of the recipient inscribed on the rim.

References

Civil awards and decorations of the United Kingdom
 
Law enforcement awards and honors
Awards established in 1938
1938 establishments in the United Kingdom
Long and Meritorious Service Medals of Britain and the Commonwealth
Courage awards
Fire service awards and honors